Daddy Cool – Star Collection is a compilation of recordings by Boney M. released by BMG-Ariola's mid-price label Ariola Express in Germany in 1991.

This release includes versions from the original studio albums as well as previous compilations The Magic Of Boney M. - 20 Golden Hits, Fantastic Boney M., 1986's medley album The Best Of 10 Years - 32 Superhits and Greatest Hits Of All Times - Remix '89 - Volume II. The timings given on the original album cover were in some cases incorrect - the list below states the tracks and versions appearing on the actual disc.

Daddy Cool - Star Collection was re-issued by BMG-Ariola as Daddy Cool in 1994 and 2001.

Track listing 
"Rivers of Babylon" (Farian, Reyam) - 1:45
 Excerpt from The Best Of 10 Years - 32 Superhits
"El Lute" (Farian, Jay, Klinkhammer, Kolonovits) - 4:25
 Edited version from The Magic Of Boney M. - 20 Golden Hits
"Rasputin" (Farian, Jay, Reyam) - 3:41
 Edited version from The Magic Of Boney M. - 20 Golden Hits. Original 7" mix ( - 4:43) released on the 2008 CD compilation "The Collection". 
"Belfast" (Hillsbury, Deutscher, Menke) - 3:32
 Original album/single version
"Hooray! Hooray! It's a Holi-Holiday" (Farian) - 3:10
 Edited version from The Magic Of Boney M. - 20 Golden Hits. Original 7" mix ( - 3:55) released on the 2007 album "Kalimba de Luna".
"Baby Do You Wanna Bump" (Zambi) - 3:40
 Original single version
"Daddy Cool" (Farian, Reyam) - 3:27
 Original album/single version
"Ma Baker" (Farian, Jay, Reyam) - 4:37
 Original album/single version
"Malaika" (Farian, Traditional) - 3:28
 Edited 7" version from Boonoonoonoos limited edition double album. Original 7" mix ( - 5:02) released on the 2008 CD compilation "The Collection". 
"Sunny" (Bobby Hebb) - 3:16
 Edited version from The Magic Of Boney M. - 20 Golden Hits
"I See a Boat on the River" (Farian, Jay, Rulofs) - 3:11
 Edited version from Fantastic Boney M.
"Painter Man" (Phillips, Pickett) - 1:57
 Short edit
"Kalimba de Luna" (Amoruso, Esposito, Licastro, Malavasi) - 4:29
 Lambada Mix - Long Version, from Greatest Hits Of All Times - Remix '89 - Volume II
"Felicidad (Margherita)" (Conz, Massara) - 3:52
 Lambada Mix from Greatest Hits Of All Times - Remix '89 - Volume II
"Barbarella Fortuneteller"  (Davis, Farian, Kawohl) - 2:59 
 Original album version
"No Woman, No Cry" (Ford, Bob Marley) - 2:59
 Edited version from The Magic Of Boney M. - 20 Golden Hits

Personnel
 Liz Mitchell - lead vocals, backing vocals
 Marcia Barrett - lead vocals, backing vocals
 Frank Farian - lead vocals, backing vocals
 Reggie Tsiboe - lead vocals, backing vocals (tracks 13 & 15)

Production
 Frank Farian - producer

Certifications

Release history
 1991 Germany: Ariola Express 290 799-200
 1994 & 2001 Germany: Daddy Cool, Ariola Express 74321 1864 2
 The Boney M. discography mentions also a Cassette release
 The Boney M. discography mentions also a Vinyl release

References

External links
 Rate Your Music, detailed discography
 Discogs.com, detailed discography
 [ Allmusic, biography, discography etc.]

Albums produced by Frank Farian
1991 compilation albums
Boney M. compilation albums